David Ewart (born March 30, 1969) is the assistant head coach for the Jacksonville Sharks of the National Arena League (NAL).

College career
Ewart attended Salem International University from 1987 to 1988 playing as an offensive lineman on the Tigers football team before transferring to East Tennessee State University. During his years at East Tennessee State, Ewart was twice named an All-Southern Conference selection and was a Division-1AA All-American selection.

Coaching career

Tampa Bay Storm
Ewart served as an assistant under Tim Marcum for seven seasons with the Tampa Bay Storm, Ewart was named the Storm's 6th Head Coach in team history on February 17, 2011. After two losing seasons, the Storm were putting together a promising 7-4 season in 2013, when quarterback Adrian McPherson was injured. The Storm went on to lose seven straight games to end the season, but still made the playoffs. This was the first time the Storm made the playoffs under Ewart. The Storm lost their first round playoff game, and with the team's eighth straight loss, the Storm fired Ewart.

Arizona Rattlers
Ewart was Arizona Rattlers' defensive coordinator from 2014 to 2016.

Head coaching record

References

External links
Tampa Bay Storm coaching staff
Dave Ewart at ArenaFan Online

1969 births
Living people
American football offensive linemen
Salem Tigers football players
East Tennessee State Buccaneers football players
East Tennessee State Buccaneers football coaches
Glenville State Pioneers football coaches
Florida Bobcats coaches
Arizona Rattlers coaches
Tampa Bay Storm coaches
Cleveland Thunderbolts coaches
St. Louis Stampede coaches
Houston Thunderbears coaches
Toronto Phantoms coaches
Jacksonville Sharks coaches